Dant is an unincorporated community in Wasco County, in the U.S. state of Oregon. It lies along the west bank of the Deschutes River between the north border of the Warm Springs Indian Reservation and the small city of Maupin, north of the Mutton Mountains. Dant is not on a paved or numbered highway.

Dant was named after Thomas Dant, president of Dant and Russell, a company that opened a perlite mine here in 1950. The Lady Frances, as the mine was called, had related infrastructure including a mill and a plant that made perlite acoustical tile. The mine was near a station named Frieda on the Oregon Trunk Railway, which ran through Deschutes Canyon. The station, dating to 1911, and a Frieda Post Office that opened in 1950, were renamed later in 1950 in honor of Dant. The mine has since closed.

The Oregon Trunk Railway, which extended  from the Columbia River to Bend, was used by the Great Northern Railway and the Union Pacific. In 1909, the competing companies started building simultaneously along opposite sides of the Deschutes but reached agreement to share the Great Northern tracks. Other stations in the vicinity included Nena, Cambrai, and Maupin to the north, and Dixon, Nathan and North Junction to the south.

References

Unincorporated communities in Wasco County, Oregon
Unincorporated communities in Oregon